Edward Francis Kelly is a research professor at Division of Perceptual Studies at Department of Psychiatry and Neurobehavioral Sciences at University of Virginia. A Ph.D. in Cognitive Sciences, Kelly's research interests include mind-brain issues and cognitive neuroscience with a focus on phenomena (e.g. from parapsychology and paranormal) that challenge the current neuroscientific view of mind.

Kelly has published peer-works in which he argues for a break from the dominant physicalist view of human mind and nature for a strong dualistic account of mind-brain problem which accepts the post mortem survival of human consciousness, drawing upon empirical evidence from psychical research such as near-death experience, stigmata and mystical experience. His two major works include Irreducible Mind and Beyond Physicalism.

Career 
In the 1960s, Kelly helped with social research at Harvard University. He later worked on a computer programming project involving text disambiguation and assigning senses to the words, which resulted in a doctoral dissertation, “A Dictionary-Based Approach to Lexical Disambiguation”. He then became a postdoctoral research fellow in computational linguistics studying models and methods for their relevance to problems in psycholinguistics and cognitive science. In the early 1970s, as a postdoctoral research associate at Institute for Parapsychology, Durham, NC, he first formed the conviction about the importance and viability of a psychobiological approach to the study of psi phenomena. His later career involved development of software for studying and analyzing biological data, raising fund for supporting laboratory research in psychophysiology and techniques and tools for electrophysiological research. In the 1990s, as a research associate professor and member of Neuroscience Group at UNC-Chapel Hill, Kelly contributed to EEG imaging techniques and neuroimaging research. Since 2002, Ed. Kelly has been a Research  professor at Department of Psychiatric Medicine, University of Virginia at Charlottesville, where he returned to his long-standing interest in mind-brain relations and laboratory studies of altered states of consciousness.

Publications 
In 2007, Kelly, along with his wife, Emily Williams Kelly, and Adam Crabtree, Alan Gauld, Michael Grosso, and Bruce Greyson published a major work, titled Irreducible Mind: Toward a Psychology for the 21st Century where they attempt to bridge contemporary cognitive psychology and mainstream neuroscience with  "rogue phenomena", which the authors argue exist in near-death experiences, psychophysiological influence, automatism, memory, genius, and mystical states. They argue for a dualist interpretation of the mind-brain relation in which the brain only acts as a "filter" or "transmitter" of consciousness which survives death of the body.

In 2015, Kelly, Adam Crabtree, and Paul Marshall published a more theoretical sequel to the Irreducible Mind, titled Beyond Physicalism: Toward Reconciliation of Science and Spirituality in which they seek to understand how the world must be constituted so that the empirical phenomena catalogued in the Irreducible Mind would be possible.

External links 
 Edward F. Kelly's Biography at University of Virginia School of Medicine, Division of Perceptual Studies

References 

American parapsychologists
Philosophers of mind
American neuroscientists
University of Virginia faculty
Living people
Year of birth missing (living people)